The Bank of Commerce Building is an historic building in Oregon City, Oregon, United States. In the early 2010s, the building's owners requested urban renewal grant funding in the amount of $40,000 to renovate exterior brick, masonry, and terra cotta, and add awnings and windows. The building houses the restaurants Ingrid's Scandinavian Food and Second Son Kimbap, as of late 2017.

References

External links

 

Buildings and structures in Oregon City, Oregon